Floyd S. Stahl (July 18, 1899 – July 26 1996) was an American collegiate athletic coach, serving in many coaching and administrative positions at Harvard University and the Ohio State University.

Stahl was the head coach of the Ohio State baseball team from 1933 to 1938. During this same period Stahl was the backfield coach for the Ohio State football team under head coach Francis Schmidt.

In 1939 Stahl joined the staff at Harvard. From 1939 to 1946 he was Harvard's baseball head coach, though no games were played in 1944–45 due to World War II; the team won its conference title in his first season in 1939, but his overall record at the school was 54–69. He also served as the basketball head coach at Harvard from 1943 to 1946. Stahl led the Harvard Crimson to their first NCAA tournament berth in 1946. Harvard was defeated in the Elite Eight by Ohio State.

Ohio State rehired Stahl the following year as their baseball head coach. He served as the Buckeyes' baseball coach from 1947 to 1950, finishing his tenure with an overall record of 129–108–1. In 1950 he switched to the basketball program, becoming the head coach for the Ohio State men's team from 1950 to 1958.

While serving as the Ohio State basketball coach, Stahl was also an associate athletic director. In 1958 Stahl gave up coaching to become Ohio State's assistant athletic director.

Stahl returned to coaching in 1966 to lead the Ohio State golf team. He was inducted into the Ohio State Varsity O Hall of Fame in 1978. Stahl died on July 26, 1996, at his son's home in Blacklick, Ohio.

Head coaching record

College basketball

References

External links
 

1899 births
1996 deaths
American men's basketball coaches
Harvard Crimson baseball coaches
Harvard Crimson men's basketball coaches
Illinois Fighting Illini baseball players
Ohio State Buckeyes baseball coaches
Ohio State Buckeyes football coaches
Ohio State Buckeyes men's basketball coaches
College golf coaches in the United States
High school baseball coaches in the United States
High school basketball coaches in Ohio
High school football coaches in Ohio